Gönül Aysel Gürel (7 February 1929 – 17 February 2008) was a Turkish lyricist and actress. Besides her lyrics, which were performed by singers throughout Turkey, she was known for her outlandish clothing, make up and wigs.

Biography 
Aysel Gürel was born in 1929 in Denizli, Turkey, in the western part of the country. She graduated from Istanbul University with a faculty of literature degree. Her lyrics were performed by such noted Turkish singers as Sezen Aksu. Besides lyric writing, Gürel also worked as an actress, drama player and a Turkologist. in 2007, Gürel appeared in a Turkish television commercial for Pepsi. Gürel was admitted to Metropolitan Florence Nightingale Hospital in Istanbul in December 2007. She was reportedly ill with lung cancer. She died of chronic bronchitis at the age of 79 on 17 February 2008 in Istanbul. Gürel was buried at Zincirlikuyu Cemetery following a funeral at Teşvikiye Mosque. Gürel was the mother of Turkish actresses, Müjde Ar and Mehtap Ar.

Tribute 
On 7 February 2018, Google celebrated her 89th birthday with a Google Doodle.

Songs written by 

She wrote the lyrics of very popular songs that reached smash hit and classical status in Turkey's music history such as;
 Allahaısmarladık (1977) by Sezen Aksu
 Firuze[A] (1982) by Sezen Aksu
 Sen Ağlama[A] (1984) by Sezen Aksu
 Haydi Gel Benimle Ol (1984) by Sezen Aksu
 Sevda (1985) by Nükhet Duru
 Git[A] (1986) by Sezen Aksu
 Ünzile (1986) by Sezen Aksu
 Değer Mi (1986) by Sezen Aksu
 Sarışın (1988) by Sezen Aksu
 Dünya Tatlısı (1988) by Zerrin Özer
 Hani Yeminin (1988) by Zerrin Özer
 Bir Kız (1988) by Ayşegül Aldinç
 Şekerim (1989) by Gökben
 Resmin Yok Bende (1990) by Ajda Pekkan
 Hadi Bakalım (1991) by Sezen Aksu
 Ne Kavgam Bitti Ne Sevdam (1991) by Sezen Aksu
 Gelmeyeceğim (1991) by Ayşegül Aldinç
 Abone (1991) by Yonca Evcimik
 Taksit Taksit (1991) by Yonca Evcimik
 Ayıpsın (1991)[A] by Aşkın Nur Yengi
 Show Yapma (1992) by Nilüfer
 Yine Yeni Yeniden Sev (1992) by Nilüfer
 Hadi Yine İyisin (1993) by Tayfun
 Yok (1993) by Ajda Pekkan
 Vurulmuşum Sana (1994) by Asya
 Of Aman (1994) by Nalan
 Yasaksız Seviş Benimle (1994) by Tarkan	
 Eğrisi Doğrusu (1994) by Nilüfer
 Gölge Çiçeği (1997) by Reyhan Karaca
 Vur Yüreğim (1999) by Sertab Erener
 Aşk (1999) by Sertab Erener
 Tılsım (2001) by Burcu Güneş

A^ She wrote the song with Sezen Aksu.

Tribute albums
Aysel'in (2013)

References

External links

Aysel Gürel lost the battle with cancer
The New Anatolian: Aysel Gurel passes away

1929 births
2008 deaths
People from Denizli
Erenköy Girls High School alumni
Turkish lyricists
Turkish stage actresses
Turkish writers
Turkish women writers
Deaths from bronchitis
Burials at Zincirlikuyu Cemetery